Beldgabred was a legendary king of the Britons as accounted by Geoffrey of Monmouth.  He was preceded by Sisillius III and succeeded by his brother Archmail.  Geoffrey says that Beldgabred surpassed all other musicians on every kind of instrument and was claimed to be the god of minstrels.

References

Legendary British kings